Tag (also called [TAG], tig, it, tiggy, tips, tick, tip) is a playground game involving two or more players chasing other players in an attempt to "tag" and mark them out of play, usually by touching with a hand. There are many variations; most forms have no teams, scores, or equipment. Usually, when a person is tagged, the tagger says, "Tag, you're 'it'!" The last one tagged during tag is "it" for the next round. The game is known by other names in various parts of the world, including "running and catching" in India and "catch and cook" in the Middle East.

Origin of name
In 2018, the popular internet meme "How old when you were when you found out " began circulating stating that the meaning of the word tag was an acronym meaning 'touch and go'. Investigation by snopes.com found this to be false. According to the Merriam-Webster dictionary, the origin of the name 'tag' is unknown, while the Oxford Dictionary of English speculates it to be a variant of 'tig', which is speculated to be a variant of 'tick'.

History
Tag-like games have been played throughout history since as far back as the fourth century BC. The Greek poet Erinna, in her poem The Distaff, speaks of a tag-like game where one girl, the "tortoise", chases other girls, and the tagged girl becomes the new "tortoise". Ancient Greek boys also played the Ostrakinda.

Indian variations of tag 
History of specific Indian tag variants:

 Kho-kho has been played in some form or other for thousands of years along with kabaddi, with certain aspects of their gameplay believed to have been mentioned in the Mahabharata, around 300 AD or before.

 Atya-patya, which goes by several other names (such as Klithatu), was also mentioned as early as 300 AD or before in the Naṟṟiṇai.

 Langdi is believed to have been played in the Pandya dynasty, at least hundreds of years ago.

Some Indian variations of tag are theorized to represent certain things from ancient Indian history; for example, there is evidence to suggest that the traditional Bengali game of gollachut, in which players attempt to run out of a circular field without being tagged by opponents, may represent escape attempts by slaves during the Indus Valley Civilization.

Tag competitions 
Major modern competitions for tag-like games ("major competitions" being those with at least 100 million views) include World Chase Tag, Pro Kabaddi League, and Ultimate Kho Kho. As for tag variants being included in prestigious events, kabaddi has found its way into the Asian Games, and is also in the South Asian Games alongside kho-kho.

Basic rules

Players (two or more) decide who is going to be "it", often using a counting-out game such as eeny, meeny, miny, moe. The player selected to be "it" then chases the others, attempting to "tag" one of them (by touching them with a hand) as the others try to avoid being tagged. A tag makes the tagged player "it". In some variations, the previous "it" is no longer "it" and the game can continue indefinitely, while in others, both players remain "it" and the game ends when all players have become "it".

Many variants modify the rules for team play or place restrictions on tagged players' behavior. A simple variation makes tag an elimination game, so that tagged players drop out of play. Some variants have a rule preventing a player from tagging the person who has just tagged them (known as "no tag-backs", "no catch-backs", "no returns", "can't tag your master" or "can't get the butcher back").

Base and truce terms
Players may be safe from being tagged under certain circumstances: if they are within a pre-determined area, off the ground, or when touching a particular structure. Traditional variants are Wood tag (see knock on wood), Iron tag, and Stone tag, when a player is safe when touching the named material. Though in most cases you will be able to stay in that pre-determined area for however long you would like, such as “house rules” including that feature. This safe zone has been called a "gool", "ghoul", or "Dell", probably a corruption of "goal". The term "gool" was first recorded in print in Massachusetts in the 1870s, and is common in the northern states of the US. Variants include gould, goul, and ghoul, and alternatives include base and home. In the United Kingdom, the base is frequently known as "den". In much of Canada and parts of the northern United States, the state or home base of being immune from tagging is known as "times" or "T", most likely as mutilation of "time out".

Players may also make themselves safe from being tagged by the use of a truce term. When playing the game tag, some may cross fingers to let others know that they, the player, cannot be it. Yet, this rule may come into play only if the crossing of fingers is shown; if the fingers are not shown to the person who is it, then the crossing does not count.

Alternate terminology
In India, the player who is "it" is referred to as the "denner".

Bans and restrictions
Tag and other chasing games have been banned in some schools in the United States due to concerns about injuries, complaints from children that it can lead to harassment and bullying, and that there is an aspect to the game that possesses an unhealthily predatory element to its nature. In 2008, a 10-year-old boy in Omaha, Nebraska, died from brain injuries suffered from falling onto a metal pole while playing tag. A school dinner lady in Dorset was left partially paralyzed after a boy playing tag ran into her in 2004; her damage claim was rejected by three Court of Appeal judges, who ruled that the boy had not broken any school rules by playing the game.

A principal who banned tag in her school criticized the game for creating a "self-esteem issue" in nominating one child as a victim, and noted that the oldest and biggest children usually dominate the game. A dislike of elimination games is another reason for banning tag. In some schools only supervised tag is allowed, sometimes with a type of tagging called butterfly tagging—a light tap on the shoulders, arms or upper back.

The president of the US National Association for Sport and Physical Education said that "Tag games are not inherently bad... teachers must modify rules, select appropriate boundaries and equipment, and make sure pupils are safe. Teachers should emphasize tag games that develop self-improvement, participation, fair play, and cooperation."

Variants

British bulldog

One (or two players) starts as "bulldog", who stands in the middle of the playing area, while the other players stand at one end of the area. The aim is to run from one end of the area to the other without being caught by the bulldog. When a player is caught, he becomes a bulldog himself. The last player is the winner and starts as "bulldog" in the next game.

Octopus tag 

Octopus tag is a mix between Red Rover and tag. "It", or "octopus", attempts to tag the other players. The playing field is known as the ocean. The players, or "fish", line up along one side of the ocean. When the Octopus calls out, "Come fishies come!", "Octopus!", or a matching attribute of one or more fishes, they try to run to the other side without getting tagged. In a variation, once the fish run to the other side without getting tagged, the game pauses until the octopus starts it again. Upon getting tagged the fish become "seaweed" and must freeze or sit where they were tagged, but they can wave their arms around and assist the Octopus in tagging other fish within their reach. The last fish to be tagged becomes the next Octopus. This game can also be played in the water and then it is called Sharks and Minnows.

Chhi-chhattar 
One player, known as the "kite", starts off inside a circle formed by all of the other players holding hands, and then breaks free, with the first of the other players to tag the kite becoming the kite in the next round of play.

Duck, duck, goose

In this game, usually played by young children, the players sit in a circle facing inward. One player, the "picker" or "fox", walks around tapping or pointing to each player in turn, calling each of them a "duck", until finally announcing one of their choosing to be the "goose". The goose then rises and runs around the circle in the same direction as the picker, attempting to return to their seat before the "picker" can sit back down in the vacated spot. In Minnesota, this game is referred to as "Duck, duck, gray duck".

Epidemiological tag 
When first tagged each player tags two others. If tagged again they ignore the tag. The game ends when the tagging stops at which point there
may be players who've never been tagged due to herd immunity.
If the game is played by a number of players equal to a power of two minus one then it is easier to compare each generation to exponential growth. For 1 or 3 players it matches, divergence is expected for 7, 15, 31 and higher players. Plotting the number of tagged versus the generation typically produces a wave shape, summing the generations typically produces an "S"-shaped curve (Sigmoid function).

Four corners 

There are multiple variations of four corners; in one variation, four players stand at four corners of a square, and attempt to swap corners with each other without being tagged by "it", who stands in the middle of the square.

Freeze tag
Freeze tag is a variation of classic tag. A player is deemed "it." When a person is tagged by "it", they are then "frozen" (staying still in the place where they were tagged). All "unfrozen" players still in play can then touch frozen players to "unfreeze" them, allowing them to be back in play. The game ends when "it" freezes all but one of the players who is then typically "it" during the next game. In some variations of the game, there may be multiple players who are "it" working together. Similar games are played that are known as Vish Amrut/Vish Amrit (Poison-Antidote), Lock and Key, Ice and Water, and Stuck in the Mud.

Kiss chase

Kiss chase, also referred to as Catch and Kiss, is a tag variant in which tagging is performed by kissing. All members of one sex are "it" at once and chase players of the opposite sex until everyone is caught, then the roles are reversed. A variant is that the player chosen to be "it" will, with assistance from players of the same gender, chase all members of the opposite sex and kiss one of them.

Kumir danga 
In this Indian game, all of the players stay in a designated area ("land"), while "it" (who is referred to as a "crocodile") stands outside of that area in the "water", and cannot step onto land. The players try to run between the water and the land without being tagged.

Poison

In the game of Poison, play starts with players holding hands around a small "poison" circle marked on the ground. The first player to be pushed or pulled into the circle become "poisoned", all hands are released and the poisoned player or players must chase the others.

River or mountain

In River or Mountain (also referred to as Nadi-Parvat in India), designated areas of the field are referred to as "river" or "mountain". The player who is "it" shouts "river" or "mountain", and the other players must go to the area called out. While outside of that area, the players can be tagged and eliminated.

Shadow tag 
Instead of touching other players, "it" tries to step on their shadows to tag them.

The floor is lava 

In one variation of "The floor is lava", the players must avoid stepping on the floor by staying on raised platforms, while "it" (sometimes referred to as the "Lava Monster") can walk across the floor and attempt to tag other players.

Tilo-Express 
Tilo-Express is a variant of hide-and-seek in which the seeker loses if they are tagged by an opponent that they have not spotted.

Team tag

Cops and robbers

Cops and robbers, sometimes called "jail", "jail tag", "team tag", "chase", "cowboys and Indians", "police and thief", "prisoner's base" "jailbreak", "releaseo" or "manhunt", has players split into two teams: cops and robbers.

A. M. Burrage calls this version of the game "Smee" in his 1931 ghost story of the same name. The cops, who are in pursuit of robbers (the team being chased), arrest the robbers by tagging the robbers and putting them in jail. Robbers can stage a jailbreak by tagging one of the prisoners in the jail without getting tagged themselves. The game ends if all the robbers are in jail. In a variant, the robbers have five minutes to hide before being hunted, and only one jailbreak may be allowed per robber. In Mario Kart 8 Deluxe for the Nintendo Switch, a variation of the game is used as a sub-mode for Battle Mode known as "Renegade Roundup".

Zombie tag

Humans vs. Zombies is a survival game of tag, where "human" players fight off increasingly large numbers of "zombies"; if a human is "turned" (i.e. tagged), then that player also becomes a zombie. At the game's beginning, there are only one or two zombies; the zombies multiply by tagging humans, turning them into zombies after a period of one hour. Humans can defend themselves from zombies by using socks, marshmallows, Nerf Blasters or any other toys deemed safe and appropriate; if a zombie is hit by one of these, they are stunned (not allowed to interact with the game in any way) for 15 seconds. The goal of the zombies is to turn all the humans; the humans, meanwhile, must outlast all the zombies.

Manhunt

Manhunt is a mixture of hide and seek and tag, often played during the night. One person is "it", while the other players have to hide. Then, the person who is "it" tries to find and tag them. The game is over when all players are out. Manhunt is sometimes played in teams. In one variant there is a home base in which a player is safe. That version ends when all players who are not safe are out.

Prisoner's Base

In Prisoner's Base, each team starts in a chain, holding hands, with one end of the chain touching the base. The end two players on each team break from the chain and try to tag each other, taking them to their base if they do. The end pair progressively break from the chain and join the tagging. As with Cops and Robbers, prisoners can be freed by tagging them in the base. The game is thought to date back to the Renaissance period, and may be inspired by the act of bride kidnapping. A game of Prisoner's Base was played by members of Lewis & Clark's Corps of Discovery against a group of Nez Perce.

Chain tag 
In chain tag (also known in India as Jod Saakli or Saakli/Saakhli), one player is "it" and attempts to tag other players. Each tagged player becomes "it" as well, with all of the "it" players required to form and remain in a human chain by holding hands. Only the two players at either end of the chain can tag other players. The game ends once all players have been tagged, with the last person tagged being the winner.

What's the time, Mr Wolf?

One player is chosen to be Mr Wolf and stands facing away from the other players at the opposite end of the playing field. All players except Mr Wolf chant in unison "What's the time, Mr Wolf?", and Mr Wolf will answer in one of two ways: Mr Wolf may call a time – usually an hour ending in "o'clock". The other players take that many steps towards Mr Wolf. They then ask the question again. Alternatively Mr Wolf may call "Dinner time!", and turn and chase the other players back to their starting point. If Mr Wolf tags a player, that player becomes Mr Wolf for the next round.

Ringolevio

In Ringolevio, there are two teams. In one version, one team goes off and hides. The other team counts to a number such as 30 and then goes looking for them. Each team has its own "jail", a park bench or other defendable area in another version. The game goes on until all of one team is in jail. In many ways, Ringolevio is similar to Prisoner's Base.

Gella-Chutt 
The king's goal is to reach home without being tagged by the defensive players. The offensive players can form a human chain and tag defensive players to eliminate them.

Bauchi 
A similar Bengali game, Bauchi, requires the offensive players to hold their breaths so long as they are outside of the home; failing to do so allows the defenders to tag out the offensive players.

Gollachut 
In Gollachut, one team starts off in the center of a circle, and each of its players attempts to reach an area at the edge of the circle without being tagged by the opponents.

Surr

Surr is played by two teams of at least four players, in a field divided by two perpendicular "lines of defense" (lanes) into four quadrants. The attacking team gathers in one quadrant, and aims to advance around the other three quadrants without having all of its players tagged out by the defensive team's players, who must remain within the lines of defense.

Variants requiring equipment

Some variants of tag use equipment such as balls, paintball guns, or even flashlights to replace tagging by hand.

Blind man's bluff

Blind man's bluff, also known as Mr Blind Man or Grounders, is a version of tag in which one player, designated as "it", is blindfolded and attempts to tag the other players, while the other players try to avoid them.

Capture the flag 

The field is divided into two halves, one for each team, and the goal of each team is to have its players go into enemy territory, grab the "flag" located in the back of their territory, and then make it back to friendly territory without being tagged.

Computer tag
Research students developed a version of tag played using handheld WiFi-enabled computers with GPS.

Flashlight tag
Flashlight tag, also called "Army tag", "Spotlight", and "German Spotlight", is played at night. Rather than physically tagging, the "it" player tags by shining a flashlight beam on other players.

Fox and geese
A traditional type of line tag, sometimes played in snow, is Fox and geese. The fox starts at the centre of a spoked wheel, and the geese flee from the fox along the spokes and around the wheel. Geese that are tagged become foxes. The intersections of the spokes with the wheel are safe zones.

Kick the can

One person is "it" and a can is placed in an open space. The other players run off and hide, then it tries to find and tag each of them. Tagged players are sent to jail. Any player who has not been caught can kick the can, setting the other players free from jail.

Laser tag

Laser tag is similar to flashlight tag, but using special equipment to avoid the inevitable arguments that arise about whether one was actually tagged. Players carry guns that emit beams of light and wear electronic equipment that can detect the beams and register being hit. The equipment often has built-in scoring systems and various penalties for taking hits. Pay-per-game laser tag facilities are common in North America.

Marco Polo

An aquatic American variant of blind man's bluff, most commonly played in a swimming pool, although it may also be played while swimming in shallow natural bodies of water (typically the areas near the shores of oceans, seas, and lakes). The players may be swimming, treading water, or walking on the bottom of the pool or body of water. The person designated "it" is required to close their eyes, and shouts "Marco!" at regular intervals; the other players must shout "Polo!" in response. "It" must use sound localization to find one of the other players and tag them. The tagged player then generally becomes "it," and the process repeats. In some variants, if any of the players who are not "it" climb out of the water to ensure not being caught (depending on the variant, this may be cheating) and the player designated "it" suspects this, they are to shout "Fish out of water!" and can open their eyes briefly to confirm this. If their suspicions are correct, then the culprit must become "it" as the game starts over.

Muckle
Muckle (sometimes called "muckle the man with the ball", "kill-the-guy-with-the-ball", "smear the queer", "kill the carrier", among other names) is the reverse of regular tag; all the other players chase "it". This player is denoted by carrying a ball (usually a gridiron football). When they are caught, they are tackled, or "muckled". Whoever retrieves the ball first or whoever attacks the one who is it then becomes it. Sometimes the last player arriving to tackle the former ball carrier is the next person to be it; in other variations the player with the ball throws the ball up in the air, where it is caught by another player who becomes it.

Nalugu Rallu Aata 

In Nalugu Rallu Aata (Four-stones game), four players stand in four quadrants of a square, with "it" restricted to moving in the borders between the quadrants. There are four stones in the middle of the square, and the objective is for each player on the team of four to get a stone and then return to their own quadrant without being tagged.

Paintball

Paintball is a sport in which players use compressed air guns (called paintball markers) to tag other players with paint-filled pellets. Games are usually played on commercial fields with a strict set of safety and gameplay rules.

Seven stones

In seven stones (known by several other names in India, such as Lagori), the attacking team throws a ball at a pile of seven stones in order to topple them, and then tries to reconstruct the pile as fast as possible. The defensive team can throw the ball at the attackers to eliminate them.

Sock tag
A tube sock is filled with a small amount of flour in the toe of the sock; the sock is then gripped by the leg hole and wielded as a flail. Striking a player with any part of the sock counts as a tag. When the sock strikes the player, the impact releases enough flour to leave a mark which serves as proof that the player was tagged.

Spud

Spud is a tag variant that is best played in large, open areas. Players begin each round in a central location. "it" then throws a ball high into the air. The other players run but must stop as soon as "it" catches the ball and shouts "Spud!" It may then take three large steps toward the player of his choosing before throwing the ball at that player. If the ball hits the target, that player becomes it and the game starts over.

Steal the bacon 

In Steal the bacon (also known as Dog and the Bone or Rumal Jhapatta in India, or steal the flingsock/handkerchief), there are two teams on opposite ends of the field, with an object placed in the center of the field. Once play begins, one player from each team attempts to grab the object and then run back to their own team's end of the field to score a point. If a player is holding the object and is tagged by an opponent, then they fail and the other team scores a point.

Tree-climbing monkey 
There are several variations of and games related to "Tree climbing monkey" (such as Marakothi and Dand parhangrha). A team of several players attempt to climb up trees, while "it" tries to tag all of them. There is a stick in a circle on the ground, and "it" has to ensure none of the opponents touch that stick. In some similar games, such as Siya Satkana, there is no tree-climbing component to the game.

Tumbang preso 

The player who is "it" guards a can placed on the ground, while one of the other players tries to throw their slipper at the can to knock it over. After throwing, players must recover their slippers and then return to the throwing area without being tagged. Before "it" can tag the players, "it" must first put the can back upright and in its original position.

Team tag sports

South Asian variations of tag 

In South Asia, several sports are variants of tag, played at the team level, sometimes internationally.

Kabaddi 

In , raiders cross a dividing line to try to tag defenders, while continuously chanting "kabbadi" on one breath while over the line, and then attempt to make it back over the line without being stopped (tackled) by the defenders. It is included in the Asian Games and even has a world championship, being played throughout India, Pakistan, Bangladesh, Sri Lanka, and Iran, as well as in Indian communities in Canada, Great Britain, the U.S., Australia, New Zealand, and the Netherlands. It was also demonstrated in 1936 Berlin Olympics.

Kho kho 

 involves an attacker trying to tag three defenders in a rectangular court. The attacker's eight teammates sit in a central lane which divides the court into two halves, and which connects two poles at either end of the court. The attacker can not cross the central lane, and can not change direction once they start running towards either pole. The attacker has the option of switching roles with a teammate by touching their back, and can also run around either pole to enter the other half of the court. Kho kho's first major professional franchise competition was the 2022 season of Ultimate Kho Kho.

Atya patya 

Atya patya is played on a rectangular court, which is split into two halves by a central lane or "trench", and which is further subdivided by nine trenches which are perpendicular to the central trench. The game is played in four 7-minute innings (turns), with teams alternating offense and defense in each inning. The goal of the attacking team is to have their players cross as many trenches as possible without being eliminated by a touch from any of the nine defensive players, each of whom stands in one of the trenches.

Langdi 

Langdi is played in a small rectangular court, with the teams each having two 9-minute turns on offense and defense. The offensive team has one player in the court, while the defensive team sends in a batch of three players at a time. The offensive player is restricted to hopping around on one foot, and aims to tag as many defenders as possible.

World Chase Tag 

World Chase Tag (WCT) is played between two teams of six players over 16 rounds of gameplay. The playing court is a -square with various objects and obstacles placed within it. Parkour is a major component of how the players navigate the obstacles in the court. In each round, one player from the offensive team (the chaser) tries to tag a player from the defending team (the evader) within 20 seconds. The evader scores a point if they successfully avoid being tagged during the round.

Tag rugby 

Tag or flag rugby is a non-contact variation in which each player wears a belt that has two velcro tags attached to it, or shorts with velcro patches. The mode of play is also similar to rugby league with attacking players attempting to dodge, evade and pass a rugby ball while defenders attempt to prevent them scoring by tagging – pulling a velcro attached tag from the ball carrier. Flag football has similar gameplay, and is a non-contact variation of American football, a game related to rugby. However, the "tag" in "tag rugby" is derived from the "tags" that the players wear and the children's game of tag more closely resembles touch rugby whereby a touch replaces a tackle.

Games involving tagging 

Some sports involve tagging as a minor, but crucial component of gameplay.

Baseball 

In the bat-and-ball game of baseball, the offensive team's players try to score by advancing around four bases without being put out (eliminated) by players on the defensive team. One way for a defender to put out an offensive player is to tag the offensive player (when they are not touching any of the bases) while holding the baseball.

See also

 Traditional games#Tag games
 Traditional games of South Asia#Variations of tag
 Traditional games in the Philippines#Variations of tag
 Assassin (game)

References

Children's games
 
Street games
Outdoor games
Pursuit–evasion